Ebertius nepalensis is a species of beetle in the family Carabidae, the only species in the genus Ebertius.

References

Broscinae